Yannick Lesourd (born 3 April 1988 in Dreux) is a track and field sprint athlete who competes internationally for France.

Lesourd represented France at the 2008 Summer Olympics in Beijing. He competed at the 4x100 metres relay together with Martial Mbandjock, Manuel Reynaert and Samuel Coco-Viloin. In their qualification heat they placed sixth in a time of 39.53 seconds and they were eliminated.

References

External links

Sportspeople from Dreux
1988 births
Living people
French male sprinters
Olympic athletes of France
Athletes (track and field) at the 2008 Summer Olympics
World Athletics Championships medalists